Pedro Ramón Cubilla Almeida (25 August 1933 in Paysandú, Uruguay – 16 March 2007 in Montevideo, Uruguay) was a Uruguayan football player and coach.

Player career 
Pedro Cubilla started his career as a professional playing for Uruguayan clubs Nacional, Peñarol, Rampla Juniors and Liverpool de Montevideo in the Primera División Uruguaya.  He continued his international career in Argentina playing for Huracán between 1963–1964 and Quilmes in 1966 in the Primera División Argentina after being transferred from River Plate in 1965, where he spent a year inactive due to an injury. He returned to Uruguay in 1967 where he played for C.A. Defensor.

In 1968, he was transferred for the former NASL Canadian team Toronto Falcons coached by the legendary Ladislao Kubala.

He also played for the Uruguay national football team, taking part of a European tour previous to the 1962 FIFA World Cup in Chile.

Coaching career 
His career as a professional coach includes Uruguayan clubs Fénix, Huracán, Danubio, Rampla Juniors, Central Español and Huracán Buceo. Internationally he coached Chilean Santiago Morning, Paraguayan Club Olimpia, Ecuadorian Deportivo Quito and C.S. Cartaginés of Costa Rica.

Pedro Cubilla also worked together with his younger brother Luis as the Assistant Coach for Uruguayan clubs Nacional, Peñarol, Paraguayan Club Olimpia and the Uruguay national football team.

In 1998, he was named president of the Uruguayan National Association of Football Trainers.

Art 
Besides football he had a passion for painting. He created many paintings containing scenes of the Afro-Uruguayan candombe culture, tango bars and portraits.

References

External links
 Art of Pedro Ramon Cubilla 

1933 births
2007 deaths
Uruguayan footballers
Uruguay international footballers
Uruguayan football managers
1962 FIFA World Cup players
Uruguayan Primera División players
Peñarol players
Rampla Juniors players
Liverpool F.C. (Montevideo) players
Club Atlético Huracán footballers
Expatriate footballers in Argentina
Uruguayan expatriate sportspeople in Argentina
Expatriate football managers in Chile
Danubio F.C. managers
Rampla Juniors managers

Association football midfielders
Footballers from Paysandú
Uruguayan painters